The Gasworks building in Bydgoszcz, Poland, is a historical edifice built between 1859 and 1860. It has also been known as the Bydgoszcz District Gas Plant and as Pomeranian Gas Company, Branch Gas Plant of Bydgoszcz. In 2003, it became part of the Polska Spółka Gazownictwa (Pomeranian Gas Company), as a branch called Gas Plant in Bydgoszcz.

Location
The edifice is the administrative seat of Bydgoszcz gasworks offices, settled at 42 Jagiellońska street. The company still occupies the historical technical and administrative buildings on the current plot.

History

Prussian period

The Gasworks company of Bydgoszcz is one of the oldest in Poland. The building was built in 1859, on a selected area of the Brda river, and it was placed into active service on October 1, 1860, when the city was part of Prussia. The choice of the location was done so that it was possible to bring coal by waterways from the  Vistula River or the Bydgoszcz Canal. The power plant was located on the former eastern outskirts of the city. The gas was produced by the combustion of coal, hence its name Coal gas, or "town gas". During the first 20 years of its existence, during which the city became part of the German Empire, the gasworks produced exclusively for street lighting: in 1860, 285 gas lighting appeared in Bydgoszcz city, replacing kerosene lamps, and illuminating most important places (offices, hotels). In 1910, 1488 lamp posts were using "town gas", with an automatic switch-on system running since 1900.

From 1880 on, coal gas has been provided also to households and industry, and in 1909, 10,065 units were already installed.

The gasplant initially covered an area of 0.8 ha. It soon grew up to 7.4 ha after World War I. Production of gas used coal from Upper Silesia and England and to ease transportation, a railway was built in 1890, along today's Oginskiego street, and joining the main network in the vicinity of Artyleryska street. During the year 1909, 1219 wagons loaded with 17500t of coal entered the gasplant through the railway. In 1881, the first renovation of the gasworks was carried out, as would happen regularly in following years. In 1905, with the construction of five furnaces has been built an administrative building, designed by architect Carl Meyer. In 1908, he created a device for the production of synthetic gas. During the 1920s, without any new investment, the economic crisis pushed the gasworks activity to slow down.

Interwar period

The company was taken over by the Polish authorities on January 21, 1920, while gas production reached then 3.7 million m3 [1]. Serious development of the gas factory began in 1925, when, with a Polish team managed by engineer Bronislaw Klimczak, the gasworks experienced a deep renovation, with the installation of several equipments: 
 a new chamber geared with Dessau system, 
 a new device for receiving and processing BTEX 
 a machine for converting ammonium hydroxide, producing of ammonium sulfate, distillating coal tar, delivering Carbolineum.

Business began to improve in 1936-1939, with the construction of a new gas pipeline. During interwar, the gasworks had a shop at Ferdinand Foch street 5, and a showroom in the administrative building, where were held, inter alia, lectures and cooking demonstrations related to gas. Just before the outbreak of World War II company employed 150 people. Gas production grew up to 6.3 million m3 in 1938. Bydgoszcz gasworks was the largest in the Pomerania, and the 6th biggest plant of the Second Polish Republic.

World War II period

In September 1939, the gasworks was taken over by nazi authorities and incorporated into the new Urban Department, together with tram system, water supply, power plant and brickyards. In 1943, German engineers launched a third furnace and rebuilt two vertically-chamber system furnaces, "Didier", with a total capacity of 22000 m3 of gas per day. During the retreat, most of the facility and gas equipment have been destroyed.

Communist period

Immediately after the liberation, starting from January 1945, repair of the gasworks was launched, and gas production to the city resumed in February. With city population growth and industrial development, the demand for gas increased. At the same time Bydgoszcz began to move away from gas street lighting: the last town gas lamps have been removed at the beginning of the 1970s. In 1951, the complex evolved into "Bydgoszcz District Gas Plant". The plant gradually widened and modernized, in particular in 1946-1948 under the supervision of architect Jan Kossowski In the years 1950s, authorities recognized that the capacity of expansion of the gas complex along Jagiellońska street were pretty limited, with regards to the urban development. As such, in 1955 it has been decided to build a new gasplant in the eastern industrial district.

Work started at Witebska street from 1962 to 1967, creating a first production capacity of about 100 000 m3: the new gas plant has been launched on September 30, 1967, and in 1973 the complex at Jagiellońska has been put out of service. The buildings, including the chimney, were demolished. At the end of the 1960s, a new gas distribution network has been built to connect the new plant to the different districts of the city. One of the first major pipelines ran from Sporna street to Wladyslaw Bełzy street along Toruńska street, with a length of about 4 km. From 1973 on, natural gas has been mainly used, pushing to expand the gas distribution network to newly built settlements in Bydgoszcz. 
Since September 24, 1990, only natural gas is supplied to customers, using pipelines from Grudziadz and Gniewkowo. Between 1987 and 1992 a complete replacement of the gas network in specific areas of the city has been carried out. Bydgoszcz gas company employs today 452 workers.

Current period

Since January 2000, Gasworks of Bydgoszcz functions as a branch of Polish Oil and Gas Company. In 2003, the plant became a branch of "Pomeranian Gas Company Sp. zoo", covering Kuyavian-Pomeranian Voivodeship and Chojnice, Czersk, Człuchów from Pomeranian Voivodeship.

Its business then included the distribution of natural gas, the network operation, maintenance and repair, together with quality controls checks of gas network. From June 2007 to October 2008, Bydgoszcz plant operated under the name "Pomorski Branch Operator System of Gas Distribution in Bydgoszcz", as a Distribution network operator. At the end of 2008, its name changed to "Pomeranian Gas Company, Branch Gas Plant of Bydgoszcz".

Architecture

The edifice on Jagiellońska street displays historicism features, leaning on Neo-classical style.

The vast elevation is built on a balanced facade, symmetric distribution of windows, enhanced by the two gates on each side of the middle avant-corps. Bossage in corner places and a triangular pediment above the avant-corps add to the impressive effect of the frontage.

Gallery

See also

 Bydgoszcz
 Jagiellońska street in Bydgoszcz
 Brda river
 Gasworks

References

Bibliography
  
  

Defunct energy companies of Poland
Oil and gas companies of Poland
Former factories in Bydgoszcz